Dianthus nardiformis is a species of herbaceous perennial plant in the genus Dianthus. It is endemic for the Carpathian Mountains .

nardiformis
Flora of the Carpathians